Francis Huster (born 8 December 1947) is a French stage, film and television actor, director and scriptwriter.

Biography 
Francis Huster was born in Neuilly-sur-Seine. His father is Charles Huster, commercial director at Lancia, and his Polish Jewish mother is Suzette Cwajbaum—who, during the Nazi era succeeded in persuading the Gestapo commandant in Paris to release her father, who had been arrested. However, her father refused to leave Paris, and was shot dead by the SS in Auschwitz as Soviet troops approached at the end of the war. He has two siblings; his older brother Jean-Pierre is a noted writer, and his younger sister, Muriel, is an actress, photographer and songwriter.

He studied acting at the Conservatoire of the 17th arrondissement of Paris, at the Cours Florent and at the Conservatoire national (1968), where he had René Simon and later Antoine Vitez as teachers.
In the Cours Florent, later, he was teacher. Among his students, there was actor & photographer Gregory Herpe, director of the Comédie Française Eric Ruf, actors Jeanne Balibar, Elsa Zylberstein, Sandrine Kiberlain.
 He joined the Comédie-Française in 1971, became sociétaire in 1977, and left this institution in 1982. He later founded the theater group Compagnie Francis Huster, of which the following actors have been members: Clotilde Courau, Valérie Crunchant, Cristiana Reali, Estelle Skornik, Valentine Varela, Olivier Martinez, Mathieu Carrière.

Awards
Francis Huster became Chevalier de la Legion d'Honneur in 1991, and was awarded the rank of "Officier" by Jacques Chirac in 2006. M Chirac commented: "C'est un comédien absolument exceptionnel qui se donne sans réserve à son art" ("He is an absolutely exceptional actor who dedicates himself totally to his art").

Filmography
 1970 : Chambres de bonne short film directed by Jean-Pierre Moulin
 1970 : En attendant l'auto... short film directed by Gisèle Braunberger
 1970 : La Faute de l'abbé Mouret, directed by Georges Franju
 1972 : Faustine et le Bel Été, directed by Nina Companeez
 1972 : L'histoire très bonne et très joyeuse de Colinot trousse-chemise, directed by Nina Companeez
 1975 : Lumière, directed by Jeanne Moreau
 1976 : Je suis Pierre Rivière, directed by Christine Lipinska
 1976 : Si c'était à refaire, directed by Claude Lelouch
 1977 : Comme sur des roulettes, directed by Nina Companeez
 1977 : Un autre homme, une autre chance, directed by Claude Lelouch
 1978 : En attendant Paul... short film directed by Georges Birtschansky
 1978 : One, Two, Two : 122, rue de Provence, directed by Christian Gion
 1978 : L'Adolescente (The Adolescent), directed by Jeanne Moreau
 1979 : Les Égouts du paradis, directed by José Giovanni
 1980 : Les Uns et les Autres (Bolero), directed by Claude Lelouch
 1981 : Qu'est-ce qui fait courir David?, directed by Élie Chouraqui
 1982 : Édith et Marcel, directed by Claude Lelouch
 1983 : J'ai épousé une ombre, directed by Robin Davis
 1983 : Équateur, directed by Serge Gainsbourg
 1983 : Le Faucon, directed by Paul Boujenah
 1983 : Drôle de samedi, directed by Bay Okan
 1984 : Première Classe, short film directed by Mehdi El Glaoui
 1984 : La femme publique (The Public Woman), directed by Andrzej Żuławski
 1984 : L'Amour braque, directed by Andrzej Żuławski
 1985 : Parking, directed by Jacques Demy
 1985 : Drôle de samedi, directed by Tunç Okan
 1986 : On a volé Charlie Spencer !, directed by Francis Huster
 1989 : Il y a des jours... et des lunes, directed by Claude Lelouch
 1992 : Tout ça... pour ça !, directed by Claude Lelouch
 1995 : Dieu, l'amant de ma mère et le fils du charcutier d'Aline Issermann
 1998 : Le Dîner de Cons (The Dinner Game), directed by Francis Veber
 2000 : L'Envol, directed by Steve Suissa
 2000 : Elle pleure pas short film directed by Steve Suissa
 2004 : Pourquoi (pas) le Brésil, directed by Laetitia Masson
 2004 : Le Rôle de sa vie (The Role of Her Life), directed by François Favrat
 2005 : Le courage d'aimer (scenes deleted), directed by Claude Lelouch
 2006 : Hey Good Looking!, directed by Lisa Alessandrin
 2008 : A Man and His Dog, directed by Francis Huster
 2017 : Chacun sa vie et son intime conviction, directed by Claude Lelouch

References

External links
 
 Allmovie biography on movies.yahoo.com
 allocine.fr entry 
 Detailed biography 
 Short biography at evene.fr 
 Unofficial website dedicated to Francis Huster  

1947 births
Living people
French male film actors
French male stage actors
Sociétaires of the Comédie-Française
Officiers of the Légion d'honneur
French people of Polish-Jewish descent
People from Neuilly-sur-Seine
French male television actors
French National Academy of Dramatic Arts alumni
Cours Florent alumni